Edward L. Holmes (1828-1900) was an American ophthalmologist who founded The University of Illinois Eye and Ear Infirmary.

A native of Massachusetts, Holmes received instruction from the historian John Lathrop Motley, and learned German from Henry Wadsworth Longfellow.  He summered at Brook Farm, an experimental, utopian, literary community, based on the principles of transcendentalism and shared manual labor.  Holmes received undergraduate and medical school training at Harvard, followed by postgraduate training at Massachusetts General Hospital.  He then studied ophthalmology and otology in Paris and Vienna.

At age 29, Holmes moved to Chicago, where, in May 1858 he founded the Chicago Eye and Ear Infirmary, the first hospital of its kind west of the Alleghenies.  Holmes served as head of the institution until 1885, when he moved to Rush Medical College, subsequently becoming staff president there.

References
Ward PS: "Ophthalmology at Illinois". Proc Inst Med Chgo, 39:24-30, 1986.
Pearlman, MD: The Illinois Eye and Ear Infirmary Rededication Evokes and Historical Sketch.  Am J Ophthalmol 63:124-132, 1967.

American ophthalmologists
Harvard Medical School alumni
Rush University faculty
1828 births
1900 deaths